The Colonial Sugar Refining Company built a mill at Viria, on the Rewa River, on the southern side of the island of Viti Levu on Fiji. It crushed from 1886 to 1895 and was closed because it was too small to be viable.

Viria Sugar Mill
Sugar companies of Fiji